Suriya al-Ghad (Arabic سوريا الغد) was a television news channel associated with the Syrian opposition.  The channel broadcast both online and on the Nilesat satellite network. The station shut down in 2022.

Founding

According to the website of the Dr. Mohamed AL Shabk Global Investment Group, the channel was launched in Paris in 2011.  An article on the Al-An news site, however, identifies activists in Cairo as the channel's founders.

References

External links
Official Website

Arabic-language television stations